Carl Arnold was an American football coach.   He was the head football coach at Jamestown College—now known as the University of Jamestown—in Jamestown, North Dakota, serving for two seasons, from 1947 to 1948, and compiling a record of 1–13–1.  Arnold was an alumnus of St. Cloud State University in St. Cloud, Minnesota.

Head coaching record

References

Year of birth missing
Year of death missing
Jamestown Jimmies football coaches